"The World Is Flat" is the first single from Echobelly's third album Lustra. It was released by the Britpop group on 11 August 1997.

The song was included on both of the greatest hits albums that Echobelly have released; I Can't Imagine The World Without Me and The Best Of Echobelly. 3 of the b-sides ("Falling Flame, Drive Myself Distracted & Holding The Wire were released on the US release of Lustra.

A music video was made for the song.

It reached 31 in the UK Singles Chart.

Track listing

UK and Australian CD 1

UK CD 2 and Japanese promo

UK maxi-single

UK promo

12" promo vinyl

Credits
Bass – James Harris
Drums – Andy Henderson 
Guitar – Glenn Johansson
Voice – Sonya Madan
Engineer – Niven Garland, Roy Spong, Danton Supple
Producer - Gil Norton, Echobelly

References

External links
https://www.discogs.com/Echobelly-The-World-Is-Flat/release/1391715
https://www.discogs.com/Echobelly-The-World-Is-Flat/release/7998505
https://www.discogs.com/Echobelly-The-World-Is-Flat/release/2526940
https://www.discogs.com/Echobelly-The-World-Is-Flat/release/4449914
https://www.discogs.com/Echobelly-The-World-Is-Flat/release/2743158
https://www.discogs.com/Echobelly-The-World-Is-Flat/release/1391726
https://www.discogs.com/Echobelly-The-World-Is-Flat/release/4045887

1997 singles
Echobelly songs
1997 songs
Epic Records singles
Song recordings produced by Gil Norton